Patrick Vahoe (born March 11, 1970) is a Solomon Islands politician. He is a member of the National Parliament of the Solomon Islands, and was elected to the Parliament representing the Malaita Outer Islands Constituency on 5 April 2006.

References

Members of the National Parliament of the Solomon Islands
1970 births
Living people
People from Malaita Province
Place of birth missing (living people)